Giroux is a French surname. Notable people with the surname include:

 Alexandre Giroux, Canadian ice hockey player
 André Giroux (painter), French photographer and painter
 André Giroux (writer), Canadian writer
 Art Giroux, Canadian ice hockey player
 Auguste Giroux, French rugby union player
 Claude Giroux, Canadian ice hockey player
 Claude Giroux (wrestler), Canadian midget wrestler
 E. X. Giroux, the pseudonym of Canadian writer Doris Shannon
 Emmanuel Giroux (born 1961), French mathematician
 Henry Giroux (born 1943), American-Canadian scholar
 Julie Giroux (born 1961), American female composer
 Larry Giroux, Canadian ice hockey player
 Lionel Giroux, Canadian midget wrestler
 Maxime Giroux, Canadian film director
 Pierre Giroux, Canadian ice hockey player
 Ray Giroux, Canadian ice hockey player
 Robert Giroux (1914–2008), American editor and publisher
 Roger Giroux (1925–1974), French poet
 Valéry Giroux (born 1974), Canadian philosopher, lawyer and animal rights activist

Other uses
 Giroux, Indre, a commune in France
 Giroux, Manitoba, a village in Canada

See also
 Giroud, a similar surname

French-language surnames